The 1890 Kilkenny Senior Hurling Championship was the fourth staging of the Kilkenny Senior Hurling Championship since its establishment by the Kilkenny County Board.

Bennettsbridge won the championship after a 1-04 to 0-01 defeat of Callan in the final.

References

Kilkenny Senior Hurling Championship
Kilkenny Senior Hurling Championship